The Philadelphia City Commissioners are three officials responsible for administering voter registration and conducting elections for Philadelphia County.

The office was created to replace the Philadelphia County Commissioners  following the consolidation of the city and county in 1854. While subject to the Home Rule Charter, the commissioners are considered county officials and do not report to council or the mayor.

The board has three members, all popularly elected every four years by the voters of Philadelphia. No political party can have more than two seats on the board. For the last half-century the guaranteed minority seat has gone to the Republican Party.

Current members

† Denotes chairperson of the board

Historical members

References

External links
 Philadelphia City Commissioners official webpage

 
Government of Philadelphia